The English cricket team toured Bangladesh from 12 October to 12 November 2003, playing a two-match Test series and a three-match One Day International series; England won all five matches to take whitewashes in both series. In preparation for the Test series, they also played two three-day tour matches against a Bangladesh Cricket Board President's XI and the Bangladesh A team.

Tour matches

Three-day: Bangladesh Cricket Board President's XI vs England XI

Three-day: Bangladesh A vs England XI

Test series

1st Test

2nd Test

ODI series

1st ODI

2nd ODI

3rd ODI

External links
Tour page at ESPNcricinfo

Bangladesh
2003-04
2003 in Bangladeshi cricket
Bangladeshi cricket seasons from 2000–01
International cricket competitions in 2003–04